Louise Robic (January 25, 1935 – March 13, 2020) was a politician in Quebec. She represented Bourassa in the Quebec National Assembly from 1985 to 1994 as a Liberal.

The daughter of Jean-Baptiste Goyer and Berthe Trudeau, she was born Louise Goyer in Montreal. She was educated at the Notre-Dame-des-Ange convent and then took a commercial course at the Alexander Business College and a course in human relations at the Université du Québec à Montréal. She also took course in real estate and various management courses and studied at McGill University. She worked for Air Canada, Royal Trust and the Caisse populaire.

Robic was an organizer for the NO campaign during the 1980 Quebec referendum and helped organize the "Yvette" gathering at the Montreal forum. From 1982 to 1985, she was president of the Quebec Liberal Party. She was elected to the Quebec assembly in 1985 and was reelected in 1989. She served in the Quebec cabinet as Minister of Cultural Communities and Immigration. She was Minister responsible for Health and Social Services and Minister responsible for financial institutions. She resigned her seat in the assembly in April 1994.

From 1997 to 2007, she was a member of the Immigration and Refugee Board of Canada.

She was founding president of the Fondation pour le Refuge des femmes de l'Ouest-de-l'Île de Montréal from 1982 to 1984. Robic was named a Dame Commander of Merit in the Sovereign Military Order of Malta.

References 

 

1935 births
2020 deaths
Quebec Liberal Party MNAs
French Quebecers
Recipients of the Order pro Merito Melitensi